Heterocharax is a genus of characins from South America, with three currently described species:
 Heterocharax leptogrammus Toledo-Piza, 2000
 Heterocharax macrolepis C. H. Eigenmann, 1912
 Heterocharax virgulatus Toledo-Piza, 2000

References
 

Characidae
Fish of South America